An election of the delegation from Finland to the European Parliament was held in 1999.

Results

Most voted-for candidates

References

Finland
European Parliament elections in Finland
European